Events from the year 1808 in Spain.

Incumbents
Monarch: Charles IV until March 19, Ferdinand VII until May 6, Joseph I since June 6

Events
May 2 - Dos de Mayo Uprising
June 5 - Uprising of Santa Cruz de Mudela
June 6 - Valdepeñas Uprising and 1st Combat of El Bruch
June 7 - Battle of Alcolea Bridge
June 9–14 - Capture of the Rosily Squadron
June 12 - Battle of Cabezón
June 14 - 2nd Combat of El Bruch
June 15-August 14 - First Siege of Zaragoza
June 20–21 - Battle of Gerona (1808)
June 24–26 - Battle of Valencia (1808)
July 14 - Battle of Medina de Rioseco
July 16–19 - Battle of Bailén
July 24-August 16 - Second Siege of Gerona
October 31 - Battle of Zornoza
November 7-December 5 - Siege of Roses (1808)

Births

Deaths
May 2 - Pedro Velarde y Santillán and Luis Daoíz y Torres
May 29 - Francisco Solano (soldier)
Vincente Maria de Acevedo

See also
Peninsular War

References

Bibliography
 Chandler, David G.  The Campaigns of Napoleon, (New York: Simon & Schuster, 1995). 
 Esdaile, Charles J. The Peninsular War, (Penguin Books, Paperback, 2003), 640 pages, .
 Glover, Michael. The Peninsular War 1807-1814, (Penguin Books 2003). 

 
1800s in Spain
Years of the 19th century in Spain